W. Hall Harris III (born 1952), Th.M., Ph.D. is the editor of two modern freely-licensed bible translations, the NET Bible  and the Lexham English Bible, and was a contributor to the New American Standard Bible 1995 Update.  Harris encourages the use of software and web resources for biblical study and teaching.  The NET Bible, begun in 1995, was intended as the first freely-available online Bible.

Education
He completed his Ph.D. at the University of Sheffield (1989) and is currently Professor of New Testament Studies at Dallas Theological Seminary.

Publications
Harris has published The Descent of Christ: Ephesians 4:7-11 and Traditional Hebrew Imagery (AGJU 32); 1, 2, 3 John - Comfort and Counsel for a Church in Crisis; Lexham Greek-English Interlinear New Testament; and Lexham Greek-English New Testament: SBL Edition.

References

External links
Faculty page at Dallas Theological Seminary

Dallas Theological Seminary faculty
Living people
1952 births